Alfred Wyndham Lushington  (22 September 1860 – 25 March 1920)  was an Anglo-Indian dendrologist born in Allahabad, India and who worked as a forest officer in the Madras Presidency.

Publications 

 1910. The Genus Citrus. Indian Forester 36:323-53
 1915. [Vernacular List of Trees, Shrubs & Woody Climbers in the Madras Presidency Vernacular List of Trees, Shrubs & Woody Climbers in the Madras Presidency]. Bilingual edition Tamil-English, 2 vols.
 1918. Madras Timbers: their use in place of European timbers, with suggestions for their classification

Books 
 1919. Nature and Uses of Madras Timbers: Arranged in Categories Containing Similar Woods, & Critically Compared With Corresponding European & Philippine Timbers. Ed. S.P.C.K. Press. 358 pp.

References

External links
 

1860 births
1920 deaths
Anglo-Indian people
Botanists active in India
Companions of the Order of the Indian Empire
Dendrologists
19th-century Indian botanists
20th-century Indian botanists
Scientists from Allahabad